Caroline Huppert (born 28 October 1950) is a French film director and screenwriter. She is the sister of French actress Isabelle Huppert and has directed more than 30 films since 1977.

Early life and career
Huppert was born in the 16th arrondissement of Paris, the daughter of Annick (née Beau; 1914–1990), an English language teacher, and Raymond Huppert (1914–2003), a safe manufacturer.  she has a brother and three sisters, including French actress  Isabelle Huppert. She was raised in Ville-d'Avray. Her father was Jewish; his Jewish family is from Eperjes, Austria-Hungary (now Prešov) and Alsace-Lorraine. Huppert was raised in her mother's Catholic faith. On her mother's side, she is a great-granddaughter of one of the Callot Soeurs.

Selected filmography
 No Trifling with Love (1977)
 Birgitt Haas Must Be Killed (1981)
 Sincerely Charlotte (1985)
 Répercussions (2008) TV Movie with Sarah Grappin and Eric Savin

References

External links

1950 births
Living people
Film directors from Paris
French people of Hungarian-Jewish descent
French women film directors
French women screenwriters
French screenwriters
Writers from Paris